Olivier Roller (born 1972 in Strasbourg), is a French photographer based in Paris. He specializes in photographic portraits, and since 2009 he has been creating photographic frescos. The images are about figures of power, and portraits of the "emperors of today", which he confronts and compares to the faces of the past, from antiquity to Napoleon.

Biography 
After studying political science and law studies in Strasbourg, Olivier Roller became a photographer.

He describes the power and influence in France, in this beginning of 21st century, by the individuals who compose them : ministers, financials, advertisers, medias leaders…

The beginnings 
Olivier's first portrait was of his grandfather in 1994, in a very tight frame and devoid of artifices. The image urges the viewer to go beyond the clichés of the portrait: to smile, stand straight, be beautiful.

Still a student, he finally turned to photography, with which he found his language and a new means of communication. He needed faces, which is why he went to meet many writers and filmmakers who promoted their work in bookstores and venues. The press subsequently promptly gives him assignments.

Jeanne Moreau 
This portrait, made in December 2005, is the first that he realizes for him, out of any assignment. He followed Jeanne Moreau at a film festival in Belgium. Back in Paris, he asks if he can photograph her "for nothing". He wants to move away from assignments, where the model is in a communication logic. 
At the end of the session, he realizes his first self-portrait, sticking his face to that of the actress. This photograph is now the cover of the book Visage by Bruno Chibane, gathering 20 years of portraits of assignments of Olivier Roller.

Figures of power 
In 2008, the Musée du Louvre gave him a carte blanche in the following terms "would you like to work on the equivalent of Sarkozy (French president) and Fillon (Sarkozy' prime minister), 2000 years ago ?". He will spend 6 months, every Tuesday (public closure’ day), all alone in the gallery of Antiques.

From the following year, he set out to confront the faces of today's "emperors" (financiers, publicists, intellectuals, diplomats, politicians, etc.) with their counterparts of the past (from the Roman emperors to Napoleon). This project is still in progress.

He contacts the men of power, proposes to them to come to make a portrait in his studio, and to become a face hanging on the wall of an exhibition.

He makes contemporaries and, sometimes, alive these pieces of sculpted stone where each break or scratch is the mirror of our fragilities. He made portrait in his studio, and made face hanging on wall

The influence of surfing 
In the collective book West is the Best, Olivier Roller speaks about his surfing practice, that he compares to photography.

Being in the ocean, in the middle of the waves, allows him not to think, just to be present. He describes this practice as "a symbolic vehicle for advancement," and explains that surfing has allowed him "to reach a certain animality" and "reconnects with reality". As in his photographic practice, Olivier Roller explains that he loves the shifting, unpredictable and even disappointing side of the practice. He compares photography to the ocean, who "has nothing against you, but you will never be able to dominate him, you just have to be humble."

Exhibitions 
 2017-2018 : Musée du Louvre, « Théâtre du Pouvoir » septembre 2017 à juillet 2018
 2017 : Centre des monuments nationaux, château d'Angers, installation La Cathédrale de fil
 2017 : Maison européenne de la photographie, acquisitions récentes - Paris
 2016 : Palazzo Al-Temps / musées nationaux romains, Rome 
 2016 : « Les larmes de la terre », The Temple (Pékin), Banpo (Xi-An), Changsha, Dunhuang - Chine
 2015 : « Oser la photographie », musée Réattu, Arles 
 2015 : « Carte blanche à Olivier Roller », Mobilier national, musée des Gobelins, Paris
 2015 : « Aller Dehors », La Criée, centre d’art contemporain, Rennes
 2014 « Figure di potere », Spazionuovo, Rome
 2014 « Lumières », musée Cognacq-Jay, carte blanche à Christian Lacroix, Paris
 2013 : « Mon île de Montmajour », abbaye de Montmajour, centre des monuments nationaux commissariat Christian Lacroix, Arles
 2013 « Rodin, la lumière de l’antique », musée de l'Arles antique, Arles 
 2010-2013 « Figures du pouvoir 1 », exposé à : 
 La Filature, Mulhouse 
 Musée des Moulages, Lyon 
 MIA Art Fair, Milan
 Villa Aurélienne, Fréjus
 SpazioNuovo, Rome, festival Foto Roma
 Festival Fotoleggendo, Rome
 Grange de Dorigny, Lausanne & participation au colloque universitaire « Le visage dans tous ses états »
 Musée de la photographie André Villers, Mougins
 Institut culturel de Fukuoka (Japon)
 Institut franco-japonais, Tokyo

Publications 
 Années 2010
 2016 : Nefta - Éditions de l'Air, des livres. Photographies prises dans les environs de Nefta dans le desert Tunisien, lieu de tournage des premiers Star Wars. 
 2015 : Visage mis à nu - Regard sur 20 ans de portraits - 304 pages - 200 portraits. Sous la direction de Bruno Chibane. Contributions ou interviews de Rodolphe Burger, Jean-Claude Brisseau, Daniel Cohn-Bendit, Christophe Donner, Clara Dupont-Monod, Mike Hodges, Julia Kerninon, André S. Labarthe, Jean-Luc Nancy, Nathalie Quintane... Chic Média Éditeur 
 2011 : 10 MAI 81, une journée particulière, accompagnée de textes d'Emmanuel Lemieux, Bourin Éditeur 
 Années 2000
 2007 : Face(s), 31 écrivains réagissent au portrait qu'Olivier Roller a fait d'eux, éditions Argol 
 2005 : Clarita's Way (bilingue français - anglais), exergue de Gertrude Stein, postface de Clara Dupont-Monod, traduction de Philippe Aronson, L'opossum Éditions 
 2002 : Aperghis, kaléidoscope d'une résidence, textes d'Isabelle Freyburger, Jempresse Éditions & Desmaret

References

External links 
 
 El Mundo, Los Rostros Del Poder, 11/07/2016
 La Repubblica, Immagini di Potere negli scatti di Olivier Roller, 16/06/2017
 Il Sole 24, Tutti da Olivier Roller per un ritratto "con rughe" alla francese, 09/06/2010
 Le Figaro, Le mobilier national fait décoller la tapisserie, 29/04/2015

French photographers
1972 births
Living people